Jabin Sambrano (born March 13, 1990) is an American football wide receiver who is currently a free agent. He played college football at Montana. He was signed by the Indianapolis Colts as an undrafted rookie free agent on April 30, 2012. He was signed to the Tampa Bay Buccaneers active roster on December 19, 2012. On December 23, 2013, he was signed the Jacksonville Jaguars' practice squad. He was signed to the team's active roster at the conclusion of the 2013 regular season. On March 5, 2015, Sambrano was assigned to the Los Angeles KISS. On May 20, 2015, Sambrano was traded to the Spokane Shock to complete the trade of Danny Southwick to the KISS. On October 16, 2015, Sambrano was assigned to the Portland Thunder.

References

External links
 Montana bio
 Indianapolis Colts bio
 Jacksonville Jaguars bio
 

1990 births
Living people
American football wide receivers
African-American players of American football
Montana Grizzlies football players
Indianapolis Colts players
Tampa Bay Buccaneers players
Jacksonville Jaguars players
Los Angeles Kiss players
Spokane Shock players
Portland Thunder players
Portland Steel players
Sportspeople from Temecula, California
Players of American football from California